Salreu is a village and a civil parish of the municipality of Estarreja, Portugal. The population in 2011 was 4,153, in an area of 16.2 km2.

References

Freguesias of Estarreja